Odium is the second full-length release by the German band Morgoth. It was released in 1993 by Century Media. It was produced by Dirk Draeger, recorded and mixed at Woodhouse Studios in Hagen, engineered and mixed by Siggi Bemm.

Track listing
 "Resistance" - 4:49  
 "The Art of Sinking" - 3:34  
 "Submission" - 5:14  
 "Under the Surface" - 5:23  
 "Drowning Sun" - 5:13  
 "War Inside" - 4:40  
 "Golden Age" - 7:14  
 "Odium" - 6:16

Credits
Marc Grewe - vocals
Harold Busse - guitars
Carsten Otterbach - guitars
Sebastian Swart - bass
Rüdiger Hennecke - drums/keyboards

References

1993 albums
Morgoth (band) albums